Segura is a river in southeastern Spain.

Segura may also refer to:
Segura, Gipuzkoa, a town in the province of Gipuzkoa, Spain
Segura de los Baños, a town in the province of Teruel, Aragón, Spain
Ségura, a commune in southwestern France
Segura, is a small town in Portugal, near the border with Spain

People with the surname
 Antígona Segura (born 1971), Mexican physicist and astrobiologist
 Antonio Segura, Spanish comic book writer
 Frederick Segura, Venezuelan track and road cyclist
 Guillermo Segurado (born 1946), Argentine Olympic rower
 Jean Segura, Dominican baseball player for the Philadelphia Phillies
 Juan José Segura-Egea, Spanish physician
 Juan José Segura-Sampedro, Spanish surgeon and researcher
 Liamani Segura (born 2008), American child singer
 Manuel F. Segura, Philippine colonel and author
 Pancho Segura (1921–2017), tennis player
Patrice Ségura (born 1961), French former footballer and manager
 Santiago Segura, film actor, producer, screen writer, and director
 Tom Segura, American comedian

See also
 Andrés Velencoso Segura (born 1978), Spanish model
 María Elisa Díaz de Mendibil Gómez de Segura, delegate of the Basque Country Autonomous Community to Argentina
 Juan Bautista Quirós Segura, president of Costa Rica in 1919
 Ruy López de Segura, 16th-century chess master